Kostas Kafalis (born 27 June 1978) is a retired Greek football midfielder.

Honours
Panionios
 Greek Cup: 1997–98

References

1978 births
Living people
Panionios F.C. players
A.P.O. Akratitos Ano Liosia players
Ionikos F.C. players
Ethnikos Achna FC players
PAS Lamia 1964 players
Super League Greece players
Cypriot First Division players
Association football wingers
Greek expatriate footballers
Expatriate footballers in Cyprus
Greek expatriate sportspeople in Cyprus
Footballers from Athens
Greek footballers